Xhino Sejdo (born 30 April 1991 in Tiranë) was an Albanian footballer. Now known as a businessman...

Club career
He has played as a goalkeeper for Kf Tirana.

Fireworks incident
On 25 March 2014 whilst Sejdo was training with KF Tirana at the Skënder Halili centre, fireworks were placed on his car which created a small explosion. Nobody was injured in the incident and the culprits were never found, and the police believing the incident to be unprovoked rather than a revenge attack on the player.

References

1991 births
Living people
Footballers from Tirana
Albanian footballers
Association football goalkeepers
FK Partizani Tirana players
KS Shkumbini Peqin players
KF Tirana players
FC Kamza players
KF Adriatiku Mamurrasi players
FC Kevitan players
Kategoria Superiore players
Kategoria e Parë players
Kategoria e Dytë players